Baingan bharta or Baigan Chokha (mashed eggplant) is an Indian dish prepared by mincing grilled eggplant (baingan) and mixing it with tomato, onion, herbs and spices. Grilling the eggplant over charcoal or direct fire infuses the dish with a smoky  flavour. Mashed eggplant is then mixed with cooked chopped tomato, browned onion, ginger, garlic, cumin, fresh cilantro (coriander leaves), chili pepper, and mustard oil or a neutral vegetable oil. Traditionally, the dish is often eaten with flatbread (specifically roti or paratha) and is also served with rice or raita, a yogurt salad. In Bihar and Uttar Pradesh, it is served hot with litti or baati.

In India, Pakistan and Bangladesh, baingan bharta is part of popular cuisine. In India, it is made in various regional styles, with ingredients varying from one region to another.

Names 

Variants
In Gujarat, it is called Ringan No Oro, in which the eggplant is roasted, then mashed, and then sautéed with mustard and cumin seeds, turmeric, red chilli powder, ginger and garlic and salt. It is served with bajra no rotlo, kadhi (a soup prepared by gram flour, curd and spices), khichadi and chhaash (buttermilk).

In Karnataka, it is called eṇṇegāyi and prepared by boiling and frying whole eggplant usually served with akki rotti. In the South Indian state of Tamil Nadu, the Tamils prepare a similar dish called kathrikai thayir kothsu, in which the eggplant is cooked, mashed, and sautéed with mustard, red chilis and sesame oil. The final step in the recipe involves adding yogurt (curds) to the mixture and dressing the dish with coriander leaves.

In the Bhojpuri-speaking regions of India (such as eastern Uttar Pradesh and western Bihar), it is known as baigan ka chokha; it is also popular within the Indo-Caribbean communities of Trinidad and Tobago, Suriname, and Guyana, where many descendants of indentured labourers from northern India live.

In Maharashtra, especially in the northern Khandesh region, vangyache bharit as they call it is served in social gatherings including wedding ceremonies. During harvest season, a special "bharit party" is organised. Bharit is usually served with puri. In , all the ingredients except for eggplant are used uncooked. Raw spring onion, tomato, green chillies, green coriander, and sometimes fresh fenugreek leaves are mixed with flame-roasted eggplant along with raw linseed oil or peanut oil. In , the above ingredients are first fried in oil with spices; then, mashed eggplants are mixed into it and cooked together. The similar process is followed in other Indian states and Pakistan with slight variations on ingredients. In Vidarbha and Khandesh, it is considered a delicacy when the eggplants are roasted on a dried cotton plant stems, a process which gives a distinct smokey flavour to the dish. The dish is served with dal, bhakri, and rice.

Protest symbol
In a protest against BT Brinjal and the introduction of genetically modified crops, volunteers from Greenpeace and Delhi's Le Méridien hotel cooked  of organic brinjal bharta at Dilli Haat, New Delhi, on 6 September 2011. This set a world record for the largest amount of the dish produced in one occasion of preparation. A portion of the final dish was sent to Indian Prime Minister Manmohan Singh's residence, accompanied by a letter of protest containing an explanation.

Notes

See also
 Baba ghanoush, Middle Eastern recipe from baked eggplant
 List of eggplant dishes

References

External links
 Step by step recipe of authentic baigan Bharta
 Baingan Bharta Recipe with Spring Onion

Rajasthani cuisine
Uttar Pradeshi cuisine
Gujarati cuisine
Bihari cuisine
Punjabi cuisine
Bengali cuisine
Pakistani vegetable dishes
Bangladeshi vegetable dishes
North Indian cuisine
Eggplant dishes
Hindi words and phrases
Indian vegetable dishes
Smoked food
Odia cuisine